This is the complete list of Olympic medallists in football.

Men

Women

Individual multiple gold medallists

Women
Two Golds
  (2008, 2012)
  (2008, 2012)
  (1996, 2004)
  (2008, 2012)
  (1996, 2004)
  (1996, 2004)
  (2004, 2008)
  (1996, 2004)
  (2008, 2012)
  (1996, 2004)
  (2008, 2012)
  (2004, 2008)
  (1996, 2004)
  (2008, 2012)
  (1996, 2004)
  (2008, 2012)
  (2004, 2008)
  (2004, 2008)
  (2004, 2012)
Three Golds
  (2004, 2008, 2012)
  (2004, 2008, 2012)
  (2004, 2008, 2012)
  (2004, 2008, 2012)

Men
Two Golds

  (2004, 2008)
  (1964, 1968)
  (1924, 1928)
  (1924, 1928)
  (1924, 1928)
  (1924, 1928)
  (1924, 1928)
  (1924, 1928)
  (1924, 1928)
  (1924, 1928)
  (1908, 1912)
  (1908, 1912)

Notes

References

International Olympic Committee results database

Football
Olympics

Association football player non-biographical articles